KKDV (92.1 MHz) is a commercial FM radio station licensed to Walnut Creek, California, and serving central Contra Costa County.  It is owned by Alpha Media and it simulcasts the country music radio format of sister station 94.5 KBAY.  KKDV targets listeners in the Diablo Valley who cannot get good reception from KBAY's transmitter in the South Bay.  KBAY and KKDV carry The Bobby Bones Show in morning drive time, syndicated from Nashville.

KKDV shares studios and offices with co-owned KKIQ 101.7 FM in Pleasanton.  KKDV's primary transmitter site is on Dunsyre Drive in Lafayette.  It utilizes a 253-watt booster station in Martinez, KKDV-FM3 also on 92.1 MHz.

History

KWME and KDFM
Its original call sign was KWME. It was owned by Walnut Creek Broadcasters with studios on Mount Diablo Boulevard.  

Its call letters switched to KDFM in 1964.  It played automated beautiful music, with quarter hour sweeps of soft instrumentals with limited talk and commercials.

KINQ, KKIS-FM and KZWC
In 1983, the station changed its call letters to KINQ and switched its former easy listening format to adult contemporary.  In 1986, the playlist stepped up the tempo, becoming Hot AC, right after it switched its call sign to KKIS-FM to match its sister station, KKIS 990 AM (now KATD).  During the fall of 1991, the station's Hot AC format eased back to a mainstream adult contemporary sound, and its sister station KKIS 990 AM began simulcasting KKIS-FM.   

On October 31, 1994, KKIS-AM-FM dropped the AC format.  Both stations flipped to Spanish-language Talk, as part of The "Z Spanish Network."  Its call letters changed to KZWC.

KFJO, KABL-FM and KKDV 
Between 1998 and 2004, 92.1 was KFJO, simulcasting 92.3 FM KSJO San Jose, as 92 KSJO, along with 92.7 FM KXJO in San Francisco and 92.7 FM KMJO in Santa Cruz.  It briefly spent time as KABL-FM.  It simulcast KABL 960 (now KNEW), which was a long-time adult standards station in the Bay Area.  

It switched its call letters to KKDV in 2005.  92.1 flipped to country music on April 6, 2022, as "Bay Country" KKDV.  It is a simulcast of KBAY 94.5, which is based in the South Bay.

See also
KGMZ-FM KKDV call letters history

References

External links

KDV
Radio stations established in 1959
Alpha Media radio stations
Country radio stations in the United States